Charlie Owens may refer to:

 Charlie Owens (artist), mixed-media artist
 Charlie Owens (footballer) (born 1997), Northern Irish footballer
 Charles Owens (tennis) (born 1950), American tennis player